Route 536, or Highway 536, may refer to:

India
 National Highway 536 (India)

United Kingdom
 A536 road

United States